The Drvenija Bridge is a bridge located in Sarajevo, Bosnia and Herzegovina.

The bridge was built during the Austro-Hungarian reign in 1898 and crosses the river Miljacka.

External links

Bridges in Sarajevo